The following is a list of local children's television shows in the United States. These were locally produced commercial television programs intended for the child audience with unique hosts and themes. This type of programming began in the late 1940s and continued into the late 1970s; some shows continued into the 1990s. Author Tim Hollis documented about 1,400 local children's shows in a 2002 book, Hi There, Boys and Girls!

The television programs typically aired in the weekday mornings before school or afternoons after school, as well as on weekends (to a lesser degree). There were different formats. Almost all shows had a colorful host who assumed a persona, such as a cowboy/cowgirl, captain/skipper/commodore/admiral, jungle explorer, astronaut, king, princess, clown, sheriff/deputy/trooper, cop, firefighter, hobo/tramp, railroad engineer, magician, "cousin", "grandfather" or "uncle", whose role was not only to be the "DJ" for syndicated material (typically cartoons, although Westerns were more popular earlier on) but also to entertain, often with a live television studio audience of kids, during breaks.

Early program fare included cartoon favorites, such as Koko the Clown, Daffy Duck, Crusader Rabbit, Dick Tracy, Popeye, Bugs Bunny, Rocky and Bullwinkle, Casper the Friendly Ghost, Mighty Mouse, Porky Pig, Deputy Dawg, Hergé's Adventures of Tintin, Mel-O-Toons, Woody Woodpecker, The Funny Company, Mr. Magoo, Space Angel and Clutch Cargo, as well as movie shorts, such as Laurel and Hardy, Our Gang/The Little Rascals and The Three Stooges, as well as animated versions of Laurel and Hardy, Abbott and Costello and The Three Stooges, and live action shorts, such as Diver Dan. Some included educational segments like the portraits of wildlife in Nature's Window.

Television broadcast markets

Alabama

Anniston
 WHMA-TV-40, later WJSU-TV: The Cousin Cliff Show (with Cliff Holman)

Birmingham
 WVTM-TV, WAPI-TV: The Balloon Goon (with Sterling Brewer)
 WBRC: Birthday Party (with Joe Langston)
 WBRC: Bozo the Clown (Bart Darby, Ward McIntyre)
 WBRC: The Bugs Bunny Show (with Benny Carle)
 WTTO, WDBB: Cartoon Clubhouse (with Cliff Holman)
 WVTM-TV, WABT: Channel 13 Theatre (Bill Wright)
 WBRC: Circle Six Ranch (with Benny Carle)
 WIAT, WBMG: The Dick Tracy Show (with Neal Miller)
 WBRC: Quick Fire McIntyre (with Ward McIntyre)
 WVTM-TV, WAPI-TV: Romper Room ("Miss Jean", "Miss Jane", "Miss Carol")
 WVTM-TV, WAPI-TV: The Sgt. Jack Show (with Neal Miller)
 WBRC: Supersonic Sam (with Horace Pumphrey)
 WVTM-TV, WABT: Tip Top Clubhouse (renamed to Cousin Cliff's Clubhouse; hosted by Cliff Holman)
 WBRC: Uncle Bill and Spooky (with Bill Wright)
 WVTM-TV, WABT: Uncle Bill's Fun Shop (with Bill Wright)
 WVTM-TV, WABT: Western Theatre (with Benny Carle)

Dothan
 Miss Becky, Bugs Bunny, and Friends (with Becky Copeland)

Florence
 Captain Jack (with Jack Worley)
 Earline in Storyland
 WHDF, WOWL: Planet 15 (with Jack Worley)
 WOWL: The Children's Hour

Huntsville/Decatur
 WAAY-TV: 31 Funtime (with Johnny Evans)
 WAAY-TV, WMSL: The Benny Carle Show (with Benny Carle)
 Captain Barney and Popeye (with Johnny Evans)
 Junior Auction (with Johnny Evans)
 Kiddie Circus (with Bill Sykes) WMSL,1961 and WHNT, 1963
 Romper Room WAAY (WAFG), WHNT and WAFF (WMSL).
 Through the Looking Glass (with "Miss Dottie" Frame, WMSL, 1958-1962)
 Western Theatre (with Johnny Evans)

Mobile
 Aunt Beka (Rebecca Horton)
 Bunnyville USA ("Barney Bunny")
 WALA-TV: Camp Walabear
 Captain Mal 
 Captain Supreme (Earl Hutto)
 Cartoonerville ("Chuck Wagon" Charlie)
 Fun and Games (with Marcia Wanaker and Rosie Seaman)
 Junior Auction 
 WEAR-TV: The Lynn Toney Show (hosted by Lynn Toney)
 Popeye Cartoon Theatre ("Captain Hank")
 Romper Room ("Miss Skeeter")
 WKRG: Rosie's Place (hosted by Rosie Seaman)
 Jungle Bob / Scuba Bob

Montgomery
 Cactus Cal (with Calvin Ruff)
 Captain Zoomar (with Walter Bamberg)
 Cartoon Carl (with Carl Stephens)
 Junior Auction (with Curt "Pop" Blair)
 Kartoon Karnival (with Billy Morgan, Martha Sadler)
 Popeye Theatre (with Curt "Pop" Blair)
 Princess Pat's Storybook Castle (with Pat Barnes)
 Romper Room ("Miss Bobbi", "Miss Sue")
 Western Theatre (with Bob Underwood)
 Willie the Clown (with Bill Smith)
 Young World (with Marge Payne)

Alaska

Anchorage
 KENI: Mother Moose (with Larry and Carol Beck)

Fairbanks
 School for Fun

Arizona

Phoenix
 KTVK: Cartoonland
 KTAR-TV: Romper Room ("Miss Sherri", "Miss Coleene")
 KPHO-TV: The Wallace and Ladmo Show (Bill Thompson as Wallace, Ladimir Kwiatkowski as Ladmo, and Pat McMahon as Gerald, Captain Super, other characters).  Also known as "It's Wallace" and "Wallace & Company."
 KPHO-TV: The Ladmo Show (Ladimir Kwiatkowski as Ladmo)
 KPHO-TV: Gold Dust Charlie (Ken Kennedy, with Bill Thompson as Wallace Sneed)

Tucson
 KVOA: Cartoon Corral ("Chuck Waggin")
 KTTU-TV/KDTU: The Friendship Club (with Bob Love)
 KGUN: Marshal K-Gun (with Burt Oien, Jack Jacobson and Bob Love) Romper Room (with "Miss Evelyn" (San Angelo))
 KMSB-TV/KZAZ: The Uncle Bob Show (with Bob Love)
 KOLD-TV: Zipo the Clown (Zipo & Friends; starring Victor Dains Sr.)

Yuma
 KYMA-DT/KIVA: The S.S. KIVA (with Don Kenny, Bob Hardy, Elmore Eaton)

Arkansas

El Dorado/Monroe
 KTVE: Bozo the Clown (with Tommy Bush)
 KTVE: Chuckles the Clown (played by Dale Nicholson)
 KTVE: Commodore Clem (with Henry Clements)
 KNOE-TV: The Happiness Exchange
 KTVE: Romper Room ("Miss June")

Fort Smith
 KFSM-TV/KFSA: Captain Chuck (with Chuck Abraria)
 KFSM-TV/KFSA: Romper Room ("Miss Nancy")
 KFSM-TV/KFSA: Uncle Elmer (with Elmer Morris)
 KFSM-TV/KFSA: Uncle Zeb (with Jerry Davis)

Little Rock
 KRTV: Betty's Little Rascals (with Betty Fowler)
 KATV: Bozo the Clown (Gary Weir)
 KARK-TV: Bozo's Big Top (Gary Weir) (Replaced much of NBC's Saturday Morning lineup)
 KARK-TV: Candy the Clown (with Gary Weir)
 KARK-TV: Captain KARK (with Lloyd Denney)
 KKYK: Clowntown USA (with Gary Weir)
 KARK-TV: Lorenzo the Tramp (with Gerry Wheeler)
 KATV: Mr. Specs' Cartoon Caravan (with Bruce Smith)
 KATV: Romper Room ("Miss Sylvia", "Miss Linda")
 KARK-TV: Six-Gun Theatre (with Volmar "Cactus" Vick)

California

Bakersfield
 KBAK-TV, KERO-TV, KJTV-TV: Uncle Woody (with Woody Bryant)

Fresno
 KMPH: Uncle Woody Show (with Woody Bryant)
 KAIL: Leebo The Clown (with Leland Harris)
 KFSN: Fun Time (with Al Radka)
 KMJ: Miss Pat's Playroom

Glendale
 KHOF: Black Buffalo's Pow-Wow

Los Angeles
 KTLA-DT: Batfink (Len Maxwell)
 KTLA-DT: Beany and Cecil (Bob Clampett)
 KTLA-DT: Bozo the Clown (with Vance Colvig Jr.)
 KTLA-DT: Bozo's Circus (with Pinto Colvig)
 KTLA-DT: Buffalo Billy (with Bob Clampett)
 KTLA-DT: Cartoon Carousel (Frank Herman, a.k.a. Skipper Frank)
 KCAL-TV/KHJ-TV: Cartoon Express (with Engineer Bill, played by Bill Stulla)
 KCOP: Cartoonville
 KCAL-TV/KHJ-TV: Chuck McCann's Funstuff (with Chuck McCann, Barry Thompson, Sonny Fox)
 KABC-TV, KTTV: Chucko the Clown (with Charles M. Runyon)
 KTTV: Daphne's Cartoons
 KABC: Domingo
 KCBS-TV/KNXT: Dusty's Treehouse (Stu Rosen)
 KTLA-DT: For Kids Only (with Skipper Frank)
 KCAL-TV/KHJ-TV: The Froozles (with Sally Baker)
 KCOP: Hobo Kelly (with Sally Baker)
 KTTV: King Koopa's Kool Kartoons (Christopher Collins)
 KTLA-DT: Light Time (with James E. Stewart and Rolf Forsberg)
 KTTV: Mr. Wishbone 
 KCAL-TV/KHJ-TV: Pancake Man (with Hal Smith)
 KTLA-DT: Pier Five Club (with Tom Hatten)
 KTLA-DT: Popeye and Friends (with Tom Hatten and Edwin McCormick)
 KTLA-DT: Popeye And Friends and Three Stooges Uncle Woody Show (with Woody Bryant)
 KCOP: Romper Room ("Miss Mary Ann", "Miss Socorro")
 KNBC: Serendipity (with Rudi Medina)
 KTTV: Sheriff John (with John Rovick)
 KCAL-TV/KHJ-TV: Shrimpenstein (with Gene Moss)
 KCOP: Skip and Woofer
 KCBS-TV/KNXT: Space Funnies (Dal McKennon)
 KTLA-DT: Squeaky Mulligan, the Talking Cat (with Al Jarvis)
 KNBC-TV: That's Cat (with Alice Playten)
 KTLA-DT: Thunderbolt the Wondercolt (John Carradine, Walker Edmiston)
 KTTV: Willy the Wolf (with Walker Edmiston)

Oakland
 KTVU: Bits and Pieces 
 KTVU: Captain Cosmic
 KTVU: Captain Satellite (with Bob March)
 KTVU: Charley and Humphrey (with Pat McCormick)
 KTVU: Romper Room
 KTVU: TV Pow (with Pat McCormick)

Sacramento/Stockton
 KOVR: Captain Delta (early 1970s)
 KTXL: Cap'n Mitch (1970s-80s)
 KCRA: Captain Sacto (Fred Wade; 1950s)
 Capn's Locker 
 Cartoonland 
 Romper Room
 Skipper Stu (hosted by Stu Nahan)

San Diego
 King Norman's Kingdom of Toys (with Norman Rosenburg)
 KOGO: The Johnny Downs Show (with Johnny Downs)

San Francisco
 KRON: Assignment Four 
 Buster and Me 
 Captain Cosmic (with Bob Wilkins) (KTVU)
 Captain Fortune
 Captain San Francisco 
 Captain Satellite (with Bob March) (KTVU)
 City Council 
 Dapper Dan's Playhouse (with Dan McGrath)
 Deputy Jay
 Fireman Frank (with George Lemont)
 Happy Birthday to You (with Lucille Bliss)
 Kippy the Kop (hosted by Dan Joffee)
 The Mayor Art Show (hosted by Art Findley)
 Mayor Art's Almanac (hosted by Art Findley)
 Romper Room ("Miss Nancy", "Miss Ruby")
 King Norman's Castle
 Skipper Sedley (KTVU)

 KGO-TV:
 Aunt Lolly's Storytime (Alice Marino)

San Jose
 Cosmo's Castle

Visalia
 KMPH-TV: Uncle Woody (with Woody Bryant)

Colorado

Denver
 KWGN-TV: Blinky's Fun Club
 KBTV: Sheriff Scotty
 KBTV: The Clubhouse Gang
 KLZ: Fred & Fae
 KFEL: Fred & Fae The Soda Shop

Connecticut

Hartford
 WFSB/WTIC: Captain Bob
 WVIT/WHNB: Colonel Clown (with Joey Russell)
 WUVN/WHCT: Flippy the Clown (with Ivor Hugh)
 WUVN/WHCT: General Funn
 WFSB/WTIC: The Hap Richards Show (with Floyd "Hap" Richards)
 WFSB/WTIC: Ranger Andy (with Orville Andrews)
WWE Network: Firefly Fun House (with Bray Wyatt)

New Haven
 WTNH/WNHC: Admiral Jack (with Guy Alyward)
 WTNH/WNHC: Captain Solomon C. Whiskers (with Mitch Agruss)
 WNHC/WTNH: Space Commander 8
 WTNH/WNHC: Kitdoodle (with Kit Adler)
 WTNH/WNHC/WHCT: Flippy the Clown (with Ivor Hugh)
 WTNH/WNHC: Happy the Clown (with Joey Russell)
 WTNH/WNHC: Mr. Goober (with Mike Warren)

Delaware
(see Pennsylvania, Maryland, and District of Columbia markets)

District of Columbia

Washington
 WWRC/WRC-TV, later WDCA: Bozo the Clown (with Willard Scott, Dick Dyszel)
 WDCA: Captain 20 (with John Kallimonis, Tony Alexis, Dick Dyszel)
 WTTG: Captain Tugg
 WTTG: Cindy Lou's Ranch (hosted by Cindy Dahl)
 WJLA/WMAL: Claire and Co Co (hosted by Claire Kress)
 WTTG: Countdown Carnival (with Bill Gormly)
 WWRC/WRC-TV: Cousin Cupcake (with Bob Porter)
 WTTG: Grandpa's Place (with Lee Reynolds)
 WTTG: Hoppity Skippity (with Jules Huber and Gordon Williamson)
 WDCA: Kids' Break (with Howard Huge)
 WJLA/WMAL: Pete and His Pals (hosted by Pete Jamerson)
 WTTG: Pick Temple (with Bob Dalton)
 WUSA (TV)/WTOP-TV: Ranger Hal (played by Hal Shaw)
 Romper Room ("Miss Lynn", "Miss Jan", "Miss Barbara", "Miss Sally", "Miss Connie", "Miss Anne")
 WWRC/WRC-TV: Sam and Friends (with Jim Henson)
 WTTG: Time for Science (with Darrell Drummond)
 WDCA: WOW (with Dick Dyszel)

Florida

Fort Myers
 WINK-TV: The Lazy Bar 11 (with "Cousin Vern" Vernon Lundquist)
 WINK-TV: Lazy Bar Club (with "Cousin Vern")

Jacksonville
 WMFJ: Here's How, (1962-1963) (with Virginia Atter and a clown known as Clark Winchester). They visited manufacturers each week to see how things are made.
 WFGA: Bozo and Skipper Ed Show, (1961–1966) Saturday mornings. 
 WFGA: Popeye & Pals with Skipper Ed, weekday afternoons and Saturday mornings.

Miami
 WPLG: Duck, Duck, Goose;  Arthur & Company
 WLBW: Banjo Billy (starring Dave Herbert)
 WCKT: Bobsville (starring Bob Clayton, later the announcer on Dick Clark's Pyramid game shows)
 WCKT: The Dungeon (with Charlie Baxter)
 WCKT: Fun Club (starring Charlie Baxter and Willie the Moose)
 WLBW: Jumpin Jack's 4 O'Clock Club (starring Jack O'Brien)
 WTVJ: The Lucky Duck Show (with Merv Griffin and Chuck Zink)
 WTVJ: Popeye Playhouse (hosted by multiple hosts) (1957-79)

St. Petersburg
 WLCY: 10 Ultimate  
 WSUN-TV: Bozo the Clown
 WSUN-TV: Captain Mac http://www.big13.com/Other%20Hosts/capt_mac_1.htm
 WSUN-TV: Cartoon Carnival
 WLCY: Romper Room
 WLCY: Submarine 10 
 WLCY: This Side Up

Tallahassee
 WFSU-TV: Miss Nancy's Store  (with Nancy Benda)

Tampa
 WFTS-TV: David D TV (1994-2000, Saturday mornings)

West Palm Beach
 WJNO (now WPTV): The Sheriff (with Bob Green)
 The Man From GHOST (Global Headquarters for the Organization to Sustain Terror), channel 5

Georgia

Atlanta
 WAGA: Batfink & Ronald McDonald (Saturdays 9:00–9:30am) 
 WXIA/WQXI/WLWA-TV: Billy Johnson
 WAGA: The Bugs Bunny Show (Bob Underwood as "Captain Bob", weekdays 5:30–6:00 pm; not to be confused with ABC's national program which aired on WLWA (ABC), now WXIA (NBC) at the time)
 WATL: Cartoon Club
 WAGA: Dooley and Co. (George Ellis as fictional hobo "Bestoink Dooley", weekdays 4:00–4:30 pm; Ellis appeared in the same role hosting local telecasts of horror film classics, Fridays 11:30 pm)
 WAGA: Mr. Pix (Dave Michaels, Saturdays 8:00–9:00am)
 WATL: Officer Don's Clubhouse (Don Kennedy)
 WSB-TV: Popeye Club with Officer Don (Don Kennedy, weekdays 5:00–6:00pm, then from 4:30–5:30pm; later on WATL)
 WLWA-TV: Romper Room (weekdays 9:00 A.M.)
 WLWA-TV: Skipper Ray (Ray MacKay, weekday mornings at 10:00 AM)
 WXIA/WQXI: Treehouse Club
 WXIA/WQXI: Tubby and Lester (Monday-Saturday 7:30 to 10 AM, 1968–72)

Augusta
 WATU: Bozo the Clown (weekdays 4:30–5:30 pm, 1970)
 WJBF: Trooper Terry (weekdays 5-5:30pm; later years 4:30-5pm; featured weatherman Terry Sams; 1960s-70s)

 WRDW-TV: "Hippity Hop" (weekdays 5:30-5:45; featuring William "Bill" Tennent; 1954-1957)

Columbus
 WRBL: Blast Off (V-Man, played by Jim Carlisle)
 WRBL: Col. Chick & Bozo (played by Charles "Chick" Autry and later by Marvin "Alec" Bush and Jack Morin)
 WRBL: Kiddie Castle Lane, later renamed Kid's Corner  (with Bonnie Brown Elmore a.k.a. Princess Bonnie)
 WTVM: Miss Patsy's Playhouse (with Patsy Avery)
 WTVM: Mr. Play-Like's Morning Special  (with Reuben Hensley) 
 WRBL: Shaun O'Hoolihan (played by John "Jack" Morin)
 WLTZ: Calliope (children's television series) (Starring Rachel Einglett Elliott)

Macon
 WMAZ: Cartoon Club

Savannah
 WJCL (TV): Bozo the Clown (weekdays 4:30–5:30 pm)
 WTOC-TV: Happy Dan (weekdays 4-4:30 pm; originally Happy Dan & The Little Rascals, later Happy Dan & Popeye)
 WTOC-TV: Romper Room (weekdays 9-9:30 am)

Thomasville
 WCTV: Romper Room

Hawaii

Honolulu
KHON (Channel 2):
 Romper Room (same host as KTRG; 1964–74)

KGU/KITV/KHVH (now KITV) (Channel 4):
 Billy Boy Moonster (1968)
 Captain Honolulu (Sgt Sacto, played by Bob Smith; 1959–68)
 Rocketship 4 (with Bob Smith; 1968–70)

KGMB (Channel 9):
 Bufo the Frog and a Mynah Bird (hand puppets; early 1960s)
 Checkers and Pogo (Pogo Poge: Morgan White; Mr. Checkers: Jim Hawthorne, Dave Donnelly, Jim Demarest; May 26, 1967 – 1982)
 Jimmie Dodd's Aloha Club (early-mid-1960)
 Sailor Al (mid-1960s)

KTRG (now KHNL) (Channel 13):
 Romper Room (same host as KHON; 1962–64)

Idaho

Boise
 KID/KIDK/KTVB: The Merry Milkman (with Jack Lythgoe)
 KTVB: Romper Room ("Miss Mary" Alsager)

Illinois

Chicago
 WGN-TV: The Adventures of Blinkey
 WFLD: The BJ and Dirty Dragon Show, aka Cartoon Town (Bill Jackson)
 WGN-TV: Blue Fairy
 WGN-TV: Bozo's Circus, later The Bozo Show and The Bozo Super Sunday Show (with Bob Bell, later Joey D'Auria)
 WGN-TV: Breakfast with Bugs Bunny (with Dick Coughlin and Ray Rayner)
 WGN-TV: Dick Tracy Crime Stopper Club (hosted by Ray Rayner)
 WBBM-TV/WBKB/WGN-TV: Garfield Goose and Friends (Frazier Thomas)
 WLS-TV: Gigglesnort Hotel (with Bill Jackson)
 WLS-TV/WBKB: Here's Geraldine (with Jim Stewart)
 WCIU-TV: Hey Colonel Frank (circa 1969-1970, 4pm weekdays, between stock market and foreign language programming)
 WLS-TV: INK:  Interesting News for Kids (circa 1972, with Fahey Flynn and Joanie Sandler, aka "Susie Streetnoise", along with a cast of various puppets)
 WGN-TV: Junior Crossroads
 WGN-TV: Junior Edition
 WBKB-TV: Junior Jamboree (later Kukla, Fran and Ollie), The Play House (with Angel Casey)
 WBKB/WCIU-TV: Kiddie A-Go-Go (with Elaine Mulqueen; not to be confused with Tampa's 10 A-Go-Go which ran during the same era)
 WGN-TV: Lunchtime Little Theatre (with Uncle Ned (Ned Locke), Uncle Bucky and Aunt Dody)
 WGN-TV: Paddleboat (with Ned Locke)
 WGN-TV: Ray Rayner and His Friends (Ray Rayner)
 WGN-TV: Romper Room ("Miss Rosemary", "Miss Beverly")
 WGN-TV: The Story Teller
 WBBM-TV/WBKB: Time for Fun (with Nicky Francis)
 WGN-TV: Time for Stories
 WGN-TV: Treetop House (with Debra Wuerfel, Tasha Johnson, Anita Klever, Mary Jane Clark, Jane McGrath)
 WGN-TV: What's the Answer

Peoria
 Bids for the Kids 
 Bozo the Clown
 Captain Jinks & Salty Sam (with Stan Lonergan)
 Hobo Kelly (with Sally Baker)
 Mr. Toyman (with Gary Gresham)
 Romper Room

Quad Cities
(see Quad Cities, Iowa market)

Quincy
 WGEM-TV: "The Prairie Farms Cactus Club" (with Dick Moore as "Cactus Jim")

Rockford
 WIFR-TV: Mr. Moustache
 WREX-TV: Rainbow Railroad
 WREX-TV: The Roddy Mac Show

Harrisburg
 WSIL-TV: The Funny Company with Uncle Briggs (hosted by Briggs Gordon)

Indiana

Evansville
 WEHT: The Peggy Mitchell Show (1961-1986)
 Romper Room ("Miss Annette")

Fort Wayne
 Happy's Place (1980s-90s) 
 Froggy's Pad (1980s-90s) 
 The Little Rascals Club (hosted by Bill Jackson)

Indianapolis
 WLWI: The Bill Jackson Show
 WHMB: Captain Hook's Pirate Adventures
 WTTV: Cowboy Bob's Corral, previously called Chuckwagon Theatre (with Bob Glaze)
 WFBM: The Harlow Hickenlooper Show (with Hal Fryar)
 WFBM: The Three Stooges Show (with Hoosier Hank, later Harlow Hickenlooper and Curley Myers)
 WTTV: Janie, previously called Popeye and Janie (hosted by Janie Hodge)
 WTTV: Popeye and Peggy (hosted by Peggy Nicholson)
 WTTV: Happy Herb
 WTTV: Ruffles' Party
 WTTV: Lunchtime Theater
 WLWI: Kindergarten College (with Pat Garrett Rooney)
 Romper Room ("Miss Julie")
 WTHR: This Side Up (with Dave Garrison & Dudley)
 WLWI/WTHR: Time for Timothy (formerly Timothy Churchmouse)

South Bend
 Kids' Adventure Zone (with Capt. Ed Friend)
 Popeye Theater (with Mike May)

Terre Haute
 WTHI-TV: Captain Jack (hosted by "Captain Jack" Haines) (1978–1982)

Iowa

Cedar Rapids/Waterloo
 KGAN-TV/WMT-TV: The Dr. Max Show (with Dr. Max Hahn)
 KGAN-TV/WMT-TV: Marshal J Show (with Jay Alexander)
 WMT-TV: Miss Ruth Ann's School 
 KWWL-TV: Romper Room ("Miss Bonnie")

Davenport
 WOC Romper Room

Des Moines/Ames
 KCCI-TV/KRNT-TV: 1-2-3 (hosted by Dolph Pulliam)
 KCCI-TV/KRNT-TV: The Breakfast Club (with Bill Riley)
 KCCI-TV/KRNT-TV: Dolph's Cartoon Corner (hosted by Dolph Pulliam)
 WHO-TV: Duane & Friend (hosted by Duane Ellett)
 WHO-TV: The Floppy Show (hosted by Duane Ellett)
 Hey Bob (with Bill Riley)
 Kadipus Land (Fred "SuPiDaK" Hiatt, "Captain Redbeard")
 WOI-TV: The Magic Window (Betty Lou Varnam)
 Romper Room
 Variety Theatre (Bill Riley) 
 Volume See (Carl Williams)

Mason City/Fort Dodge
 Bart's Clubhouse (hosted by Bart Curran)
 Uncle Dick's Fun House

Quad Cities
 WQAD-TV: Bozo's Circus (with Keith Andrews)
 KWQC-TV/WOC-TV: Cactus Jim (with Bob Allard)
 KWQC-TV/WOC-TV: Cap'n Don's Cartoon Showboat (Don Warren)
 KWQC-TV/WOC-TV: Cap'n Ernie's Cartoon Showboat (with Ernie Mims)
 KWQC-TV/WOC-TV: Captain Ken's Cartoon Showboat (with Ken Wagner)
 KWQC-TV/WOC-TV: Cap'n Vern's Cartoon Showboat (with Vern Geilow)
 KWQC-TV/WOC-TV: The Circle 5 Ranch (with Walt Reno as "Cowboy Whitey")
 KWQC-TV/WOC-TV: The Circle 6 Ranch (with Wes Holly as "Cowboy Wes")
 KWQC-TV/WOC-TV: Comic CutUps (with Ken Wagner)
 WHBF-TV: Grandpa Happy (with Milt "Trader Milt" Boyd)
 WHBF-TV: Iowanna Pow-Wow (with Milt Boyd)
 WQAD-TV: Jungle Jay (with Gene King)
 WHBF-TV: The Magic Carpet (with Jan Schrage)
 WQAD-TV: Q-Deenie 
 KWQC-TV/WOC-TV: Romper Room ("Miss Barbara", "Miss Gwen", "Miss Donna")
 WQAD-TV: Romper Room ("Miss Peggy")

Sioux City
 KVTV: Bingo's Big Top (with Dave Madsen)
 KVTV: Book Bandwagon 
 KVTV: Canyon Kid's Corner (with Jim Henry)
 KTIV: Cartoon Time (with Gene Quilleash, Dutch Meyers)
 KTIV: Commander Four (with John Rickwa, Gene Quilleash)
 KMEG: Klarence the Klown (with Bill Bass)
 KMEG: Pops (with Dave Webber) 
 KMEG: Puppin's Place (with Tim Poppen)

Kansas

Wichita
 KAKE-TV: Cap'n Bill (Bill McLean) and Popeye (Clarence Brown)
 KAKE-TV: Deputy Dusty (hosted by Dusty Herring)
 KAKE-TV/KTVH/KWCH-TV: Freddy Fudd (with Henry Harvey)
 KSNW/KARD-TV/KSAS-TV: Major Astro (with Tom Leahy)
 KAKE-TV: The Old Cobbler (with John Froome)
 KAKE-TV: Romper Room ("Miss Marty" and "Miss Fran")
 KAKE-TV/KWCH-TV/KTVH: Santa's Workshop (with Henry Harvey)
 KAKE-TV: Uncle Bill Reads the Funnies (hosted by Bill Boyle)

Kentucky

Bowling Green
 WLTV-TV: Uncle Albert's General Store 1962-64 (with George Goldtrap)

Lexington
 WKYT-TV: The Windy Wonderful Show 1959-65 (with Mary Ann Kuykendall)

Louisville
 WHAS-TV: Cartoon Circus (with Randy Atcher)
 WDRB-TV:Funsville (Presto The Magic Clown) (Feb. 28, 1971-?)
 WHAS-TV: T-Bar-V Ranch (with Randy Atcher, Tom "Cactus" Brooks) March 1950-April 1971
 WAVE-TV: The Magic Forest (with Ed Kallay, Julie Shaw)
 WLKY-TV: Bob Terry and His Pirates (1963-1967)
 WLKY-TV: Romper Room (various hostesses, 1962-1970)
 WAVE-TV: "Blue Apple Playhouse" (1977-?)

Paducah
 WPSD: Romper Room ("Miss Emily", "Miss Kay", "Miss Penny", "Miss Betsy")

Louisiana

Baton Rouge
 Storyland (1955–1988), hosted by Buckskin Bill Black (WAFB-TV)

Monroe
 The Happiness Exchange (KNOE-TV)

New Orleans
 Bozo the Clown
 Johnny's Follies (WVUE)
 Johnny's Showboat (WVUE)
 Mr. Bingle (WDSU) 
 Polycarp
 Popeye and Pals (WWL-TV)
 Romper Room ("Miss Ginny", "Miss Linda"; WDSU)

Shreveport
 Al's Corral, hosted by Al Bolton (KSLA-TV)
 Bob and His Buddies, hosted by Bob Griffin (KSLA)
 Bozo the Clown (KTBS-TV)
 Captain Talltower and Cartoons (KTAL-TV)

Maine

Bangor
 WABI: Bozo's Circus
 WLBZ-TV: The Eddie Driscoll Show
 WEMT: Romper Room (with "Miss Nancy" Dysart)

Portland
 WGAN/WGME: Cap'n and the Kids (with Lloyd Knight)

Maryland

Baltimore
 WJZ-TV: The Bob McAllister Show
 WMAR: Bozo the Clown (with Stu Kerr)
 WMAR: Caboose (with Stu Kerr and Kevin Clash)
 WBFF: Captain Chesapeake (George Lewis)
 WJZ-TV: The Lorenzo Show (with Gerry Wheeler)
 WMAR: Mr. Morning's Clubhouse (with Stu Kerr)
 WMAR: Professor Kool (with Stu Kerr)
 WMAR: Romper Room ("Miss Nancy" Claster, "Miss Sally"; also seen with "Miss Sally" in TV markets without local Romper Room shows)
 WBAL-TV: Paul's Puppets children's marionette show that ran from 1948 to 1958
 WBAL-TV: P.W. Doodle (Royal Parker), children's cartoons and Mickey Mouse Club reruns 1962-1965
 Maryland Public Television: Bob the Vid Tech (with Bob Heck) Children's Interstitials and specials 1993-2010

Massachusetts

Boston
 WBZ-TV: Boomtown (with Rex Trailer)
 WCVB, WHDH-TV: Bozo the Clown (with Frank Avruch) (also seen in TV markets without local Bozo shows)
 WLVI-TV/WKBG-TV: Bunker Hill (with Bob Glover)
 WLVI-TV: Captain Boston (with Chris Claussen)
 WSBK-TV/WIHS-TV: The Children's Hour (with Paula Dolan)
 WCVB, WHDH-TV: Commander Jet's Comedy (with Bill Harrington)
 WCVB/WHDH-TV: The Natural World with Captain Bob/ Drawing from Nature with Capt. Bob (with Bob Cottle)
 WCVB-TV: Jabberwocky (Tucker Smallwood, JoBeth Williams)
 WCVB-TV: A Likely Story (late 1980s - early 1990s)
 WHDH-TV, WNAC-TV: Major Mudd (with Ed McDonnell) 
 WCVB, WHDH-TV: Romper Room ("Miss Jean")
 WHDH-TV: RTV (Ready To Go!!!) (weekday morning magazine program for children)
 Skiddle Alley (with Rex Trailer)
 WBZ-TV: Small Fry Club (with Big Brother Bob Emery)
 WNEV-TV: The Story Lady (mid 1980s)
 WSBK-TV: Willie Whistle ("Dick Beach") 
 WGBH-TV: ZOOM (While the program was shown on PBS stations in the US and Canada, most of its primary audience was made up of children in the Metro Boston region.)

Springfield
 WHYN: The Admiral and Swabby (with Gary Garrison, Norm Goyer)
 WHYN: Bozo the Clown
 WHYN: Cy's Weather 
 WHYN: Elby's Weather 
 WHYN: The Swabby Show 
 WGGB-TV WHYN: Pete & Willy's Tree Hut

Worcester
 WSMW-TV: Bozo the Clown

Michigan

Detroit
 The Auntie Dee Show (with Dee Parker)
 WXYZ-TV: Cartoon Fun 
 WXYZ-TV: Hot Fudge 
 Jingles in Boofland
 WXYZ-TV: Lunch With Soupy Sales (1952–1959)
 Milky The Twin Pines Magic Clown
 Milky's Party Time 
 Oopsy The Clown 
 Popeye Theater with Captain Jolly and Poopdeck Paul
 Ricky the Clown (with Irv Roming)
 Sagebrush Shorty (with Ted Lloyd)
 Sonny Elliot 
 Wixie's Wonderland (with Marv Welch)

Detroit Area
 Get Up Get Out 
 Kids Enjoy Yourselves Without Drugs

Flint
 WJRT-TV: Bozo the Clown

Grand Rapids
 WZZM-TV: Bozo the Clown
 WOOD-TV: The Buck Barry Show
 WOOD-TV: Captain Woody (with Andy Rent)
 WOOD-TV: Romper Room (with "Miss Jean")

Kalamazoo
 WWMT-TV/WKZO-TV: Channel 3 Clubhouse (with Beanie Brown and Uncle Fred)

Lansing
 WJIM-TV: Ranger Jim (with John Kelly then known as Jack Kelin,who then went on to host Kelly and Company with Marilyn Turner

Minnesota

Austin
 The Uncle Robb (Buff "Uncle Robb" Setterquist KMMT Channel 6)

Duluth
 Bozo the Clown (Ray Paulsen)
 Bugs Bunny Rides Again (with Ray Paulsen)
 Captain Q (with Jack McKenna)
 Mr. Tolliver's Travels (with Herb Taylor)
 Mr. Toot (with Ray Paulsen)
 Romper Room ("Miss Jane")

Minneapolis/St. Paul
 Axel and His Dog (with Clellan Card, Don Stolz, Mary Davies) WCCO-TV 1954–66
 Boots and Saddles (Jimmy Valentine) KSTP-TV c. 1955
 Bozo the Clown (Roger Erickson) WCCO-TV c. 1961–63
 Burn 'Em Up Barnes 
 Cap'n Ken / Grandpa Ken (with Ken Wagner) KMSP-TV c. 1959–68
 Captain 11 (with Jim Lange) WTCN-TV (Ch 11) c. 1953–55 (with Chris Wedes) WTCN-TV (Ch 11) c. 1955–58
 Captain Daryl (Daryl Laub) KSTP-TV c. 1955–57
 Carmen's Cottage (with Mary Davies) WCCO-TV 1966–77
 Clancy and Company / Clancy and Willie (with John Gallos, Allan Lotsberg) WCCO-TV 1963–77
 Clancy the (Keystone) Cop (with John Gallos) WCCO-TV 1959–61
 Clancy the Space Cop (with John Gallos) WCCO-TV 1961
 Commodore Cappy (with John Gallos) WCCO-TV 1957–59
 Dave Lee and Pete (with Dave Lee) WTCN-TV (Ch 11) c. early 1960s
 Jimmy's Junior Jamboree (with Jimmy Valentine) KSTP-TV c. 1948–54
 Joe the Cook (with Chris Wedes) WTCN-TV (Ch 11) c. 1956
 Johnny .44! (with Jack Hastings) WCCO-TV c. 1956–58
 J. P. Patches / The Carnival Clown (with Daryl Laub) WTCN-TV (Ch 11) 1953–55; (with Chris Wedes) WTCN-TV (Ch 11) 1955–58
 Junior Auction (Roger Erickson) WCCO-TV c. 1963; (Roger Awsumb)WTCN-TV (Ch 11) c. 1968
 Juvenile Auction (Jimmy Valentine) KSTP-TV
 Lunch with Casey (Roger Awsumb WTCN-TV (Ch 11),  1953–1972; Chris Wedes WTCN-TV (Ch 11), 1953–58; Lynn Dwyer, WTCN-TV (Ch 11), 1958–72)
 Popeye and Pete (Dave Lee) KMSP-TV c. 1959
 Popeye's Clubhouse WCCO-TV (Mel Jass) c. 1956–57, (Dale Woodley) c. 1957–1959; (Jack Hastings) c. 1959–60
 Riddle Griddle (Jimmy Valentine) KSTP-TV c. 1948
 Roger! (Roger Erickson) WCCO-TV c. 1963
 Skipper Daryl (Daryl Laub) WTCN-TV (Ch 11) 1953–55
 T. N. Tatters (Daryl Laub) KSTP-TV c. 1955–57
 Toby's Talent Hunt (Toby Prin) WTCN-TV (Ch 4) c. 1950
 Uncle Toby's Tune Time (Toby Prin) WTCN-TV (Ch 4) c. 1949
 Wrangler Steve (Steve Cannon) WTCN-TV (Ch 11), c. 1955

Rochester
 KMMT: Uncle Rob

Mississippi

Columbus
 WCBI-TV: Funtime With Uncle Bunky (with Robert "Uncle Bunky" Williams), weekday afternoons, 1958-76

Missouri

Joplin
 Romper Room ("Miss Judy")

Kansas City
 KMBC-TV: Torey and Friends (hosted by Torey Southwick)
 WDAF-TV: Western Roundup (hosted by Uncle Frito Frank)

St. Louis
 KPLR-TV: Buck's Ranch 
 KPLR-TV: Captain 11's Showboat (with Harry Fender), 1959-1968
 KSDK/KSD-TV: Corky's Colorama (with Clif St. James)
 KACY-TV: The Cricket and Millie (with Mildred Savage, Eleanor Donohue)
 KETC: Fignewton's Newspaper (with Leo and Dora Velleman)
 KETC: The Finder (with Sonny Fox)
 KMOV/KMOX: D. B.'s Delight (with Doug Kincaid)
 KMOV: Gator Tales (with Doug Kincaid)
 KTVI: The Little Rascals (Fred Moegle)
 KTVI: Lorenzo and Friends (with Gerald Wheeler)
 KSDK/KSD-TV: Mickey and Amanda (with Richard Clayton)
 KDNL-TV/KTVI: Mr. Patches the Clown (with Jack Miller)
 KETC: A Number of Things (with Leo and Dora Velleman)
 KTVI: Romper Room ("Miss Joan", "Miss Lois")
 KMOV/KWK: The S.S. Popeye, later named Cookie and the Captain (with Jim Bolen, Dave Allen)
 KTVI: Suzy's Playroom 
 KTVI: Treehouse Time (with Jack Murdock)
 KSDK/KSD-TV: Whistle V Ranch 
 KMOV/KMOX: World of Mr. Zoom (with Jack Miller)
 KSDK/KSD-TV: The Wranglers Club (with Harry Gibbs)

Springfield
 KOLR/KTTS: Birthday Party (with Rene Handley)
 KOLR/KTTS: Captain Briny (with Wayne Grisham)
 KYTV: The Children's Hour (with Norma Champion)
 KSPR: Sammy's Place 
 KOLR/KTTS: Television Classroom

Montana

Billings
 KULR-TV/KGHL: Happy Herb (with Herb McAllister)
 KULR-TV/KGHL: Maury's Carnival (with Maury White)
 KULR-TV/KGHL: Pete and Friends (with Pete Perlain)

Butte
 KXLF: Popeye, Wallaby and Friends 
 KXLF: Tots and Teens (with Paul Simitzes) 
 KXLF: XL Corral (with Paul Simitzes)

Nebraska

Lincoln
KOLN/KGIN: Cartoon Corral

Scottsbluff
KSTF: The Wilmer Worm Show (with June Beaman)

Nevada

Las Vegas
 KLAS: The Bostick Western Show 
 KLAS: The Cinderella Show (with Merle Bunker)
 KLAS: Commander Lee (with Jack Lehman)
 KLAS: Rascal Rabbitt (with Caroll Spinney)
 KLRJ: Romper Room (with "Miss Nancy" Merle Bunker)

New Hampshire

Manchester
 WMUR: Ring-A-Ding The Clown Show (Dwight Damon)
 WMUR: The Uncle Gus Show (with Gus Bernier)

New Jersey
 WBTB, later WTVG, then WWHT: The Uncle Floyd Show (with Floyd Vivino)

(see New York and Pennsylvania markets)

New Mexico

Albuquerque
 KGGM: Romper Room (with Joyce Marron)
 KOAT: Uncle Howdy (with Howard Morgan)
 KOAT: Uncle Roy (with Roy Will)

New York

Albany/Schenectady
 Commander Ralph (with Ralph Vartigian)
 WRGB: Freddie Freihofer Show (with Jim Fisk)
 WTEN/WCDA: Romper Room ("Miss Diane") and Popeye and the 3 Stooges with the Old Skipper
 WRGB: Satellite Six (with Glendora)

Binghamton
 WMGC-TV: Bozo the Clown (with Larry Crabb)
 WNBF-TV: The Officer Bill Show (with Bill Parker) (1964–1972)
 WNBF-TV: Popeye and the Admiral (with Len Hathaway)
 WMGC-TV: Romper Room
 WNBF-TV: TV Ranch Club (with Bill Parker) (1949–1959)

Buffalo
 WKBW-TV: The Commander Tom Show (with Tom Jolls) 1965–1991
 WKBW-TV: Rocketship 7 with Dave Thomas (1962–1978); Mike Randall, Bob Stilson, Tim Warchocki (1992–1993)
 WGR-TV: Romper Room
 WUTV: U's Place (with Craig Scime), 1996–2001

Elmira/Ithaca
 Jerry's Playhouse (with Jerry White)
 TV Clubhouse (with Coach Carl Proper)

New York
 WPIX: The Beachcomber Bill Show (with Bill Biery; Herb Bass)
 WNBC-TV: Birthday House (with Paul Tripp)
 WPIX: Bozo the Clown (with Bill Britten)
 WPIX: The Carol Corbett Show (Carol Corbett)
 WPIX: Cartoon Express (with Bill Britten)
 WPIX: Cartoon Zoo (Milt Moss)
 WNBC-TV, later WABD: The Children's Hour (with Stan Lee Broza)
 WPIX, later WNEW-TV (now WNYW): The Chuck McCann Show (with Chuck McCann and Paul Ashley)
 WNEW-TV (now WNYW): Chuck McCann's Laurel and Hardy Show (with Chuck McCann and Paul Ashley)
 WPIX: Clubhouse Gang (with Joe Bolton)
 WNYW: The D.J. Kat Show
 WNBT/WNBC-TV: Facts N' Fun (with Shari Lewis)
 WNEW-TV (now WNYW): Felix the Cat and Friends (with "Uncle" Fred Scott and Allen Swift)
  Filbert the Flea, Buster's Buddies, Tom Corbet Space Cadet, Magic Clown, Singing Lady, Mister I-magination (with Paul Tripp)
 WABD/WNEW-TV (now WNYW): Freddie the Fireman (with Ed McCurdy)
 WNTA (now WNET) Funderama (with Herb Sheldon, Arnold Stang, Morey Amsterdam)
 WABD/WNEW-TV (now WNYW): Funny Bunny (with Dick Noel)
 WNEW-TV (now WNYW): Great Bombo's Magic Cartoon Circus Lunchtime Show (with Chuck McCann and Paul Ashley)
 WCBS-TV: The Great Foodini (with Hope Bunin and Morey Bunin)
 WWOR-TV/WOR-TV: Happy Felton's Knothole Gang (with Happy Felton)
 WRCA/WNBT/WNBC-TV: Howdy Doody Show (original puppet) (with Frank Paris)
 WABD/WNEW-TV (now WNYW): J. Fred Muggs Show
 WOR-TV (now WWOR-TV): The Johnny Andrews Show (with Johnny Andrews, Paul Ashley and Chuck McCann)
 WABC-TV: Jolly Gene and His Fun Machine (with Bill Britten)
 WPIX: Joya's Fun School
 WNTA (now WNET): Junior Carnival (with "Uncle" Steve Hollis) (Sunday version of essentially same show as Junior Frolics with different host)
 WNTA (now WNET): Junior Frolics (with "Uncle" Fred" Sayles)
 WNEW-TV (now WNYW): Just for Fun! (with Sonny Fox)
 WPIX: Kartoon Klub (with Shari Lewis)
 WPIX: Laurel and Hardy and Chuck (with Chuck McCann)
 WPIX: Let's Have Fun! (with Chuck McCann, Paul Ashley and Terry Bennett)
 WOR-TV (now WWOR-TV): Little Tom Tom at the Wigwam Party (with Gene London)
 WNEW-TV (now WNYW): Lunch with Soupy Sales
 DuMont: The Magic Cottage (with Pat Meikle)
 WPIX: The Magic Garden
 WOR-TV (now WWOR-TV), later WPIX: The Merry Mailman (with Ray Heatherton)
 WOR-TV (now WWOR-TV): Merry Mailman's Funhouse (with Ray Heatherton)
 WPIX: Pancake Man (with Hal Smith)
 WCBS-TV: The Patchwork Family (with Carol Corbett and Carey Antebi)
 WPIX: Pixie Playtime
 WPIX: Popeye (with Captain Allen Swift)
 WNTA-TV (now WNET): The Puppet Hotel (with Chuck McCann and Paul Ashley)
 WABC-TV, later WNEW-TV, later WOR-TV: Romper Room ("Miss Gloria", "Miss Joan", "Miss Barbara", "Miss Louise", "Miss Mary Ann", "Miss Molly")
 WNEW-TV (now WNYW): The Sandy Becker Show
 WABD/WNEW-TV (now WNYW): Sandy Becker's Fun House!
 WOR-TV (now WWOR-TV): The Scrub Club (with Claude Kirchner)
 WPIX: Shariland (with Shari Lewis)
 DuMont: Small Fry Club (with Bob Emery)
 WNEW-TV (now WNYW): The Soupy Sales Show
 WOR-TV (now WWOR-TV): The Space Explorer's Club (with Al Hodge)
 WOR-TV (now WWOR-TV): Space Station Nine (with Chubby Jackson)
 WNEW-TV (now WNYW): Speak Out (with Sonny Fox)
 WOR-TV (now WWOR-TV): Steampipe Alley (with Mario Cantone and Judy Katchska)
 WNTA (now WNET): Studio 99½ (with Jimmy Nelson)
 WOR-TV (now WOR-TV): Super Adventure Theater (with Claude Kirchner)
 WNTA (now WNET): Super Serial (with Al Hodge and Eric Page)
 WPIX: The Surprise Show (with Hank Stohl, Morey Bunin, Jimmy Boyd)
 WCBS-TV: Terry Tell Time (with Carol Reed, Morey Bunin, Hope Bunin)
 WOR-TV (now WWOR-TV): Terrytoon Circus (with Claude Kirchner)
 WPIX: The Three Stooges Funhouse (with Officer Joe Bolton)
 WABC-TV: Tinker's Workshop (with Bob Keeshan, Dom DeLuise, Henry Burbig, and Gene London)
 WABC-TV: Time for Fun (with Joe Bova)
 WABC-TV: The Tommy Seven Show (with Ed Bakey)
 WNBC-TV: Uncle Wethbee (with Tex Antoine)
 WNBC-TV: Watch Your Child/The Me Too Show
 WNEW-TV (now WNYW): Winchell-Mahoney Time (with Paul Winchell)
 WNEW-TV (now WNYW): Wonderama (with Sonny Fox; Bob McAllister)

Plattsburgh
 Scoop O'Brian presented 1950s Superman TV episodes

Rochester
 Gary the Happy Pirate
 Romper Room ("Miss Ann", "Miss Rita")
 Skipper Sam

Syracuse/Auburn
 WNYS-TV, WCNY-TV: Ladybug's Garden (with Cathy Stampalia and Jerry Sanders)
 WTVH/WHEN-TV: Magic Toy Shop (with "Play Lady" (Jean Daugherty); "Miss Merrily" (Marilyn Hubbard) and "Eddie Flum Num" (Socrates Sampson))
 WCNY-TV: Pappyland (originally on local public access before airing nationally on TLC and select PBS member stations)
 WNYS-TV: Bozo the Clown (with Mike Lattiff)
 WNYS-TV: Romper Room ("Miss Cathy", "Miss Joan")
 WSYR-TV: Salty Sam's Super Saturday (Bill Lape)
 WSTM-TV/WSYR-TV: Saturday Showboat ("Salty Sam")

Utica/Rome
 WKTV: Bozo the Clown (with Edwin Whitaker)

Watertown
 The Danny Burgess Show
 Kiddie Karnival (with Dan Burgess)

North Carolina

Asheville
 WLOS: Mr. Bill and Bozo
 WLOS: Mr. Bill's Workshop (with Bill Norwood)

Charlotte
 WSOC: Clown Carnival (with Brooks Lindsay)
 Ever-Ever Land 
 WBTV: Junior Rancho / Little Rascals Club (with Fred Kirby)
 Romper Room ("Miss Melissa", "Miss Jody", "Miss Carol")
 Sgt. Mills

Greenville/New Bern
 Romper Room ("Miss Patsy")
 WITN: Witney the Hobo
 Telestory Time with Elenor Hawkins: WFMY 1952-1958; WCTI 1963-

Raleigh/Durham
 WRAL: Bozo the Clown (with Paul Montgomery) (1958-1961)
 Frog Hollow (1981-1985)
 Time for Uncle Paul (with Paul Montgomery) (1961-1981)
 Sparks (1985-1990)
 The Androgena Show (1992-1996)
 WPTF: Barney's Army (1979-1983)

Winston-Salem/Greensboro
 Mr. Green  
 WFMY: The Old Rebel and Pecos Pete Show (with George Perry, Jim Tucker and "Lonesome Lee" Marshall)
 WGHP: Romper Room
 WFMY: Six-Gun Playhouse (with George Perry)

North Dakota

Bismarck
 KFYR: Marshall Bill (with Bill Owen)
 KFYR: Romper Room (with "Miss Connie" Burnham & ""Miss Vonnie" Becker)

Fargo
 KXJB-TV: Captain Jim (with Jim Rohn)

Ohio

Akron
 WAKR-TV: Hinky Dinks
 WAKR-TV: Professor Jack

Canton
 WJAN-TV: Alfred Alligator
 WJAN-TV: Milton The Milkman

Cincinnati
 The Bean's Clubhouse (with Bud Chase)
 Captain Glenn's Bandwagon (with Glenn Rowell)
 WKRC: Commander 12 (with Glenn Ryle)
 Laff House Gang (with Lee "Louie the Louse" Fogel)
 WXIX-TV: Larry Smith Puppets (with Larry Smith)
 A Million Laughs (with Bob Shreve)
 Mr. Hop (with Dave Manning)
 Popeye & Billy
 The Popeye Show (with Bob Shreve)
 Romper Room ("Miss Kay", "Miss Paula")
 Signal Three (with Art Mehring)
 The Skipper Ryle Show (Glenn Ryle)
 The Three Stooges Show (Bob Shreve)
 WCPO-TV: The Uncle Al Show (with Al and Wanda Lewis)

Cleveland
 Barnaby (with Linn Sheldon)
 WJW (TV)/WXEL-TV: By Jupiter
 WKYC/WNBK/KYW: Captain Glenn
 Captain Penny (with Ron Penfound)
 WKYC/WNBK/KYW: Cartoon Time
 WJW (TV)/WXEL-TV: Comedy Carnival
 Franz the Toymaker (with Ray Stawiarski)
 Hickory Hideout (with Cassie Wolfe and Wayne Turney)
 WKBF-TV John and Clem
 King Jack / King Jack's Toy Box
 WJW (TV)/WXEL-TV: Merry-Go-Round
 Mr. Jingeling
 WKYC/WNBK/KYW: Popeye Theater with Mister Mac
 Romper Room ("Miss Barbara")
 Star Babes
 Tip Top Clubhouse (with Dom DeLuise)
 Uncle Jake (with Gene Carroll)
 Uncle Jake's House (with Gene Carroll)
 Woodrow the Woodsman (with Clay Conroy)

Columbus
 ACTV/Access 21: BeBe the Clown
 WCLS-TV: Crystal Palace (with Nina Gilbert)
 WBNS-TV: Flippo the Clown (with Bob Marvin)
 WTTE-TV: Fox28 Kids' Club (with Yolanda Harris)
 WBNS-TV: Luci's Toy Shop (with Lucille Gasaway)
 Romper Room
 WTTE-TV: TV28 Kids' Club (with Susan Gilbert)
 WINJ-LP: TV8 Kids' Fun Festival (with Ella Flowers, also known as 'Pink Morning Cartoon')

Dayton
 WHIO-TV: Charlie Goodtime (with Dave Eaton)
 WKEF-TV: Clubhouse 22 (with Malcolm Macleod, "Dr. Creep")
 WHIO-TV:Ferdy Fussbudget (with Ken Hardin)
 WHIO-TV:Nosey the Clown (with Jack Jacobson)
 WKEF-TV:Romper Room ("Miss Jo" (Jo Corey), "Miss Anne")
 WKEF-TV:Toody the Clown
 WHIO-TV:Uncle Orrie (with Joe Rockhold)
 WKTR-TV: Kim's Kartoon Kapers (with Kim Christy)

Lima
WIMA-TV:
 The Barry Patch (with Barry Lillis)
 Charlie's Cartoon Clubhouse (with Chuck Osburn)
 For Kids Only (with Sam Fitzsimmons)
  IN-SIDE with Ron Blazer and Charlie Chunk (Chuck Osborn)

Springfield
 WSWO-TV: Bozo the Clown (with Dave Eaton)

Steubenville
 Creegan and Crow

Toledo
 Captain Cotton and Salty (with Jerry Carr)
 Fun Farm
 Patches and Pockets
 Salty's Cartoon Party

Youngstown
 The Captain Hal Fryer Show
 Clancy's Tip Top Club House

Oklahoma

Oklahoma City
 WKY: 3-D Danny (with Danny Williams)
 WKY: Circle 4 Ranch Foreman Scotty
 KOCO: Lunch With Hoho (with Hoho the Clown)

Tulsa
 KJRH: Big Bill and Oom-A-Gog (with Bill Blair)
 KTUL: Captain Ben (with Bob Jernigan)
 KTUL: Dr. Ding A Ling's Cartoon Laboratory
 KOTV: The Kids Carnival (with Bob Latting)
 KOTV: Lee Woodward and King Lionel
 KOTV: The Lorenzo Show (with Gerald Wheeler)
 KTUL: Mr. Zing and Tuffy (with John Chick and Wayne Johnson), 1963–71
 KOTV: Spanky's Clubhouse (with Spanky McFarland; 1950s)
 KTUL: Uncle Zeb's Cartoon Camp
 KTUL: Uncle Zip's Do Da Day!
 KOTV: Zeta, on Satellite Six (with Jim Ruddle)

Oregon

Eugene
 KVAL-TV: Addie Bobkins (with Bob Adkins), 1957–1961
 KVAL-TV: Captain Shipwreck (with Gordon Bussey) 1961-1967
 Jack's Kartoon Clubhouse
 KVAL-TV: Mr. Fixit (Tom Stanford and Dave Weinkauf)
 KVAL-TV: Red Reynolds, 1954–1957

Portland
 KPTV: Addie Bobkins (with Bob Adkins), 1961–64
 KPTV: Bar 27 Corral (with "Heck" Harper)  1950s
 KPTV: Bent Nails (with Gene Brendler), early 1960s (Temporary replacement for injured Rusty Nails)
 KATU: Bumpity
 KOIN: Cartoon Circus with "Mr. Duffy" (played by Frank Kincaid), 1958–71
 KATU:  Cartoonival with Rusty Nails mid-1960s
 KPTV: Dr Zoom (with George Ross, "Mad Scientist" character)  Mid-1960s.
 KPDX: Galaxy Robot
 KGW: "Heck" Harper Early 1960s.
 KPTV/KOIN: Mister Moon (with Ed Leahy), 1955–1958
 KPTV: The Ramblin' Rod Show (with Rod Anders)  1960s/1997
 KATU: Romper Room  1950s  (Varying hosts.)  1950s/ Early 1960s.
 KATU/KPTV: Rusty Nails (with Jim Allen; hosted Three Stooges shorts)  Late 1950s - Early 1960s.
 KPTV: Uncle Charlie (with Charlie LaFranchise.  Railroad Engineer host of Round House, model trains & cartoons, late 1950s/early 1960s)
 KPTV: Uncle Charlie's Den 1962-?? (with Charlie LaFranchise)
 KOIN: Saddlepals (with Red Dunning), 1953–55
 KATU: Popcorn

Pennsylvania

Erie
 The Pappy Show (with Skip Lecher)

Harrisburg/Lancaster
 Cowboy Pete (Paul Baker)
 Percy Platypus and Friends (aka Per-Ki Place) (with Marijane Landis and Jim Freed)
 Pete McTee's Clubhouse
 Romper Room ("Miss Marcia")
 Sunshine Corners (with Marijane Landis)
 Tricky Ricky and Popeye

Johnstown/Altoona
 Romper Room ("Miss Sally", "Miss Patty")
 Sy Seaweed's Popeye Playhouse (with Charlie Ritchey)

Philadelphia
 Adam Android (with Aldo Farnese)
 Al Alberts Showcase (with Al Alberts)
 Bertie the Bunyip (with Lee Dexter)
 Big Top (with Jack Sterling)()
  Breakfast Time (with Wee Willie Webber)
 Candy Apple News Company (with Matt Robinson)
 Captain Noah and His Magical Ark (with W. Carter Merbreier and Patricia Merbreier)
 Captain Philadelphia (with Stu Nahan)
 Carney C. Carney (with Harry LeVan)
 Cartoon Comics
 Cartoon Corners (with Gene London)
 Cartoon Party (with Pauline Comanor)
 Challenge (with Anita Klever)
 Chief Halftown (with Traynor Halftown)
 The Horn and Hardart Children's Hour (with Stan Lee Broza)
 C'mon to Uncle Pete's (with Pete Boyle)
 Dickory Doc (with Aldo Farnese)
 Frontier Playhouse (with Pete Boyle)
 Fun House (with Pete Boyle)
 The Ghost Rider (with Robert Olander)
 Grand Chance Roundup (with Gene Crane)
 Happy the Clown (with Howard Jones)
 In the Park (with Paul and Mary Ritts and Bill Sears)
 Jack Valentine's T-K Ranch (with Jack Valentine)
 KYW-TV: The Lorenzo Show (with Gerry Wheeler)
 Lunch with Uncle Pete (with Pete Boyle)
 Mr. Rivets (with Joe Earley)
 Pete's Gang (with Pete Boyle)
 WCAU-TV: Pixanne (with Jane Norman)
 Popeye Theater (hosted by  Sally Starr)
 Ranger Joe (with Jesse Rogers)
 Rex Trailer's Ranch House (with Rex Trailer)
 Romper Room ("Miss Claire")
 Sawdust Sam (with Howard Ennis)
 Shorty the Clown (with Bill Hart)
 Sidewalk Science (with Gerry Wheeler)
 Surprise Shop (with Pete Boyle)
 Tottle (with Jane Norman)
 Wee Willie Webber Colorful Cartoon Club (with Wee Willie Webber)
 Willie the Worm (with Warren Wright)
 The World Around Us (with Anita Klever)

Pittsburgh
 WTAE-TV: Adventure Time (with Paul Shannon)
 WTAE-TV: Cappelli & Company (with Frank Cappelli)
 Captain Jim
 WIIC/WPXI: Capt. Jim's Popeye Club (with Ted Eckman)
 WPTT: Captain Pitt (with George Lewis) (same as Captain Chesapeake)
 WIIC/WPXI: Cartoon Colorama (with Don Riggs)
 The Children's Corner (Josie Carey and Fred Rogers)
 KDKA-TV: Funsville (with Sterling Yates, Josie Carey)
 WDTV: Happy's Party (with Ida Mae Maher), DuMont, 1952–53)
 KDKA-TV: Josie's World (with Josie Carey)
 WQED: Mister Rogers' Neighborhood (with Fred Rogers)
 WTAE-TV: Ricki & Copper (with Ricki Wertz)
 WTAE-TV: Romper Room ("Miss Jan")

Scranton/Wilkes-Barre
 Buckskin Jim (Jim Ward)
 Captain Orbit (Jim Ward)
 The Land of Hatchy Milatchy (with Nancy Berg and Judy Burns)
 Romper Room ("Miss Marion" and "Miss Mary Ruth")
 Rosco the Clown (with Frank LaBarr)
 Showboat (with Nancy Berg)
 Topper's Clubhouse
 The Uncle Ted Show (with Ted Raub)

Rhode Island

Providence
 Commander Jet
 Cowboy Hank (with Hank Bouchard)
 Draw Podner
 Hey Wake Up
 WJAR: Hippity Hop (The Cartoon Cop)
 WNAC-TV: Bozo the Clown
 The Little Circus
 Romper Room ("Miss Bonnie")
 WPRI-TV: Salty Brine's Shack (with Salty Brine)
 WPRI-TV: Salty's Funny Company (with Salty Brine)
 Storytime (with Beth Chollar)
 Sunday Funnies

South Carolina

Charleston
 The Adventure Lady (with Anna Lee Smalls)
 Commodore Moore
 WCSC-TV:Happy Raine (with Lorraine "Rainey" Evans)
 Princess Charleen (with Charleen Carrel)
 WCSC-TV: Uncle Charlie's Playhouse (with Charlie Hall)

Columbia
 Aboosa Ya Ya
 Cactus Quave (with Mackie Quave)
 Deputy Billy (with Allen Sloan)
 The Jolly Jim Show (with Jim O'Shea)
WIS-TV: Mr. Knozit (with Joe Pinner)
 Princess Pat (with Pat Bouknight)
 Stanley And The Stooges

Florence/Myrtle Beach
 WBTW-TV ( Captain Ashby with Ashby Ward)
 WBTW-TV ( Spaceship C-8 with Dick Taylor),
 WEYB-LP ( Fox 56 Kids Club with Sly Fox)

Greenville/Spartanburg
 Captain Jack and Mr. Dutch (with Jack Six and Rene Royaards)
 The Little Rascals (with Monty DuPuy)
 Sunday Island (with Jack Six and Rene Royaards)
 Tim the Squirrel / Mr. Dutch (with Rene Royaards)

South Dakota

Rapid City
 Captain Glenn's Fun Wagon (with Glenn Rowell)
 The Jolly Postman (with John Clement)

Sioux Falls
 Bozo the Clown (with Pat Tobin)
 KELO-TV: Captain Eleven (with Dave Dedrick) (1955-96)
 Junior Auction (with Roger Russell)
 Romper Room ("Miss Carolyn")

Tennessee

Chattanooga
 WDEF TV: Mr. Chickaroonie (with Warren Herring and Mildred Gaither; 1953-1955)

Jackson
 WBBJ/WDXI: The Cousin Tuny Show (with Doris Freeman as Cousin Tuny)
 The Sheriff Big Jim Show

Knoxville
 Bozo the Clown (Johnny Mountain) (WTVK)
 Popeye Show (Mike Thurman) (WATE)
 Romper Room (WTVK)

Memphis
 Bozo the Clown
 WMCT-TV: The Looney Zoo (with Harry Mabry as Looney Zookeeper, later Trent Wood)
 Magicland (Dick Williams)
 Romper Room

Nashville
 WSM-TV: Bozo The Clown (Tom Tichenor) Later, on WSIX-TV by a different personality.

Texas

Abilene
 KRBC: Cousin Pogo and Calvin Kiwi

Amarillo
 KGNC-TV: Captain Kidd (with Allen Shifrin)

Austin
 The Uncle Jay Show (with Jay Hodgson)

Beaumont/Port Arthur
 Cowboy John (with John Garner)

Corpus Christi
 KZTV: Uncle Bob's Playhouse

Dallas/Fort Worth
 Cartoon Clubhouse
 KXAS: The Children's Hour (with Bill Kelley) (1970-92)
 The Frito Kid (with Bob Stanford)
 WBAP-TV: Bobby Peters Show (1950's; with Bobby Peters)
 WFAA: Mr. Peppermint (1961–69) and Peppermint Place (1975–96) (with Jerry Haynes)
 KTVT: Slam Bang Theatre (with Bill "Icky Twerp" Camfield)
 The Webster Webfoot Show (with Jimmy Weldon)
 KMEC/KBFI-TV: Bozo the Clown
 KXTX: Whistlestop Theatre (1977)
 KXTX: The Good Time Gang (1977-78) (with Frank Kurtz and Daryl Kurtz; the clubhouse setting and a sign reading the show's title was also demonstrated during KXTX's Cartoon Clubhouse in the 1980s)

El Paso
 KDBC-TV: Bozo's Big Top
 KELP/KVIA: Cadet Don (with Al Eisenmann)
 KDBC-TV: Red Brown and Anna Lee
 KELP/KVIA: Romper Room
 KTSM-TV: Sesame Street (While this program was shown on NET/PBS stations in the US, the show was aired on KTSM-TV from 1969, due to El Paso not having have a NET/PBS affiliated station until 1978 when KCOS went on the air. KTSM-TV also picked up Mister Rogers' Neighborhood due to the same reason.)

Houston/Galveston
 Cadet Don (with Al Eisenmann)
 Happy Hollow (with Mary Jane Vandiver)
 Kiddie Troopers (with Don Mahoney and Jeanna Clare)
 KTRK-TV: Kitirik (with Bunny Orsak) (1954–71)
 Mary Jane's Magic Castle (with Mary Jane Vandiver)
 No-No the Clown

Lubbock
 KDUB: Admiral Foghorn (with Paul Archinal and Trixie Bond)
 KDUB/KMBK: Sunshine Sally (with Joyce White)

Odessa/Midland
 Romper Room ("Miss Judy")

San Antonio
 Captain Gus (Joe Alston)
 Johnny's Treehouse (Johnny Dugan)
Howdy Doody 1951 Chester Howard
Little Rascals 1951  Chester Howard 
Roy Rogers  1951. Chester Howard 
Gene Autry. 1951. Chester Howard

Utah

Salt Lake City
 KSL TV: Admiral Bernie with Bernie Calderwood
 KUTV: Aunt Lolly's Storytime
 KCPX: Captain Scotty
 KSL TV: Engineer Ron with Ron Ross
 KCPX: Fireman Frank
 KCPX/KTVX TV: Hotel Balderdash
 KCPX: KC's Club
 KSL TV: Kimbo the Clown with Jack Whitaker
 KSL TV: Lucky Pup
 KSL TV: Princess MakeBelieve with Alene Dalton
 KSL TV: Romper Room with Miss Nancy (Jackie Nokes), and Miss Julie (Edna Andersen)
 KSL TV: Sheriff Jim with John Lugt
 KSL TV: Story Princess with Alene Dalton
 KSL TV: Uncle Roscoe with Roscoe Grover

Vermont

Burlington
 WCAX: Polar Bear Theatre
 WCAX: Romper Room (with "Miss Pat" Nilsson)

Virginia

Norfolk/Portsmouth
 WVEC: Bungles the Clown
 WAVY: Poop Deck Pappy (Mac McManus)
 WVEC: Romper Room ("Miss Connie")

Richmond
 Romper Room ("Miss Joan")
 Sailor Bob

Roanoke/Lynchburg
 WLVA: Cactus Kids Club (with George Weeks)

Washington, D.C.
 WRC-TV: Sam and Friends (1955-61) (hosted by "Sam the Frog" who later became the famous Kermit the Frog).
 WTTG: Captain Tugg (early 1960's)
 Clair and CoCo

Washington

Bellingham
 KVOS: Frisky Frolics (1970s-1980s)

Everett
 Channel 3/Everett Cablevision: Jaycee Clown Show (with Crash the Clown (Nik Boldrini) and Captain Fuzz (Richard Boldrin) (1971–72))

Seattle/Tacoma
 KCPQ/KTVW-TV: Flash Blaidon
 KCPQ/KTVW-TV: Sheriff John
 KCPQ: Captain Sea-Tac
 KING-TV: King's Klubhouse (Stan Boreson)
 KING-TV: Sheriff Tex
 KING-TV: Wunda Wunda (Ruth Prins)
 KIRO-TV: J. P. Patches (Chris Wedes)
 KIRO-TV: Sheriff Shot Badly
 KOMO-TV: Boomerang (Marni Nixon)
 KOMO-TV: Captain Puget (Don McCune)
 KSTW/KTNT: Brakeman Bill's Cartoons (with Bill McLain)
 KSTW/KTNT: Robot Roundup
 KSTW/KTNT: Romper Room
 KSTW: Ranger Charlie's Kids Club

Spokane
 KREM: Captain Cy Show (late 1950s/early 1960s)  (Host: David Cyrus Page, ran Popeye cartoons).
 KHQ: Romper Room ("Miss Florence")  (Late 1950s/ Mid 1970s).
 Cosmic Cable: (" Sally Jo Clapper") (Cox Cable local Original children's program) (1988-1991).

Yakima
 KAPP-TV/KAPP: Mr. Bob's Cartoon Classics (Bob Ivers)
 KIMA: Uncle Jimmy's Clubhouse (Uncle Jimmy Nolan)
 KIMA: Uncle Jimmy's Story Hour (Uncle Jimmy Nolan)

West Virginia

Charleston/Huntington
 Mr. Cartoon (with George Lewis and Jule Huffman)
 Steamboat Bill (George Lewis)
 Romper Room ("Miss Marilyn" Fletcher)

Parkersburg
 WTAP: PMA Pulse (with Todd Baucher)

Wheeling
 Comedy Time
 Creegan & Crow (hosted by George Creegan)

Wisconsin

Eau Claire
 The Sheriff Bob Show

Green Bay
 WBAY-TV: Captain Hal
 WBAY-TV: Colonel Caboose
 WLUK-TV: Sesame Street (Despite the show airing on NET/PBS in much of the US, WLUK aired Sesame Street from 1969 until the launch of WPNE-TV in 1972 due to the Green Bay area not having a PBS station).

Madison
 WISC-TV: Circus 3 (with Howie Olson & Cowboy Eddie)
 Cousin Sam
 WHA-TV: The Friendly Giant (with Bob Homme)
 WKOW-TV: Marshall the Marshall (with Marsh Shapiro)
 WMTV: Romper Room ("Miss Judy")

Milwaukee
 WITI-TV: Albert & Friends
 WISN-TV: Bozo the Clown
 WCGV-TV: Bozo's Breakfast Club
 WITI-TV: Cartoon Alley
 WMVT-TV: Children's Fair
 WISN-TV: Dick Tracy with Sergeant Lee
 WITI-TV: Funny Farm
 WTMJ-TV: Kid's Klub
 WISN-TV: Lippy Lucy with Bob Trent
 WITI-TV/WUHF-TV: Mac the Mailman
 WISN-TV: Pops' Theater
 WISN-TV/WITI-TV/WVTV: Romper Room
 WOKY-TV/WTVW/WISN-TV: Uncle Hugo
 WITI-TV: You & I

Wausau
 Romper Room
 WAOW/WAEO: Sesame Street (Despite being shown on NET/PBS stations in the US, the show was aired on WAOW from 1969 until 1972 and on WAEO from 1974 until 1976, due to most of northern Wisconsin not having a NET/PBS affiliated station with the exceptions of Duluth-Superior (due to the area having its own NET/PBS station) and Eau Claire-Chippewa Falls (due to cable systems and over-the-air antennas can easily receive KTCA in the area) until the launch of WHRM-TV in 1976).

Wyoming

Casper
 The Fun Ranch (Jack Slothower)
 Tumbleweed (with Dick Frech)

Cheyenne
 KGWN: Captain 5
 Timmy O'Toole

Guam
 KUAM-TV: Romper Room

See also
 Children's television series

References

External links
 Benny Carle-Classic Alabama TV (on Birmingham/Huntsville TV in the 1940s/50s/60s/70s)

Local children's television series
 
Lists of American television series